The Beijing X3 or previously the Senova X35 is a subcompact crossover positioned above the smaller Senova X25 Subcompact crossover produced by BAIC Motor under the Senova sub-brand and later the Beijing sub-brand.

First generation (2016-2018)

Debuting on the 2016 Beijing Auto Show in China, the pricing of the X35 was estimated to start around 70,000 yuan to 90,000 yuan, positioning the crossover under the compact Senova X55 CUV. The Senova X35 is powered by a 1.5 liter petrol engine producing 116 hp and 148 nm powering the front wheels via a five-speed manual gearbox or a four-speed automatic gearbox. A 1.5 liter turbo engine mated to a six-speed automatic gearbox was added to the line-up later.

Second generation (2019–present)

The second generation Senova X35 was unveiled in April 2019 during the 2019 Shanghai Auto Show with the Chinese name "Zhida" (智达). Deapite being essentially an extensive facelift of the first generation X35, the Senova X35 Zhida was completely redesigned featuring the new "Offspace" design language.
The Senova X35 Zhida is powered by a 1.5 liter turbo engine producing 110 kW and 210 N-m mated to a CVT.

As of 2020, the second generation model was later renamed to Beijing X3 after the launch of the revamped Beijing brand.

References

External links 

X35
Crossover sport utility vehicles
2010s cars
Cars introduced in 2016
Cars of China